Promachoteuthis is a genus of small, weakly-muscled squid found at bathypelagic depths. Three species have been formally described, while another two await description.

References

External links

Tree of Life web project: Promachoteuthis
Promachoteuthidae discussion forum at TONMO.com

Squid
Cephalopod genera
Taxa named by William Evans Hoyle